Vaccinium arboreum (sparkleberry or farkleberry) is a species of Vaccinium native to the southeastern and south-central United States, from southern Virginia west to southeastern Nebraska, south to Florida and eastern Texas, and north to Illinois.

Description
Vaccinium arboreum is a shrub (rarely a small tree) growing to 3–5 m (7.5-12.5 feet) rarely 9 m) (22.5 feet) tall, with a diameter at breast height of up to 35 cm (14 inches). The leaves are evergreen in the south of the range, but deciduous further north where winters are colder; they are oval-elliptic with an acute apex, 3–7 cm long and 2–4 cm broad, with a smooth or very finely toothed margin. Sparkleberry grows on sand dunes, hammocks, dry hillsides, meadows, and in rocky woods. It also grows on a variety of moist sites such as wet bottomlands and along creek banks.

The flowers are white, bell-shaped, and 3–4 mm (0.12-0.16 inches) in diameter with a five-lobed corolla, produced in racemes up to 5 cm (2 inches) long. The fruit is a round dry berry about 6 mm (0.24 inches) in diameter, green at first, black when ripe, edible but bitter and tough. They are eaten by various wildlife. 

Because of its relative hardiness in comparison to other Vaccinium species, Vaccinium arboreum has been investigated as a potential rootstock for expanding the range of blueberry cultivation to less acidic soils(PH>6.0) and reducing the severity of bacterial leaf scorch

References

External links

Missouri Plants: Vaccinium arboreum
Virginia Tech Dendrology: Vaccinium arboreum
United States Department of Agriculture Plants Profile of  Vaccinium arboreum

arboreum
Flora of the United States
Plants described in 1785
Berries